"Comeback Kid" is a song written and performed by noise pop duo Sleigh Bells, issued as the official lead single for their second album Reign of Terror (following the promotional single "Born to Lose"). The song was released January 17, 2012. On February 18, the band performed the song on Saturday Night Live.

Music video
The music video was directed by Miller and Gregory Kohn. It was filmed in Jupiter, Florida, Miller's home town. Scenes were shot in his old neighborhood, his mother's room and a local grocery store.

Critical reception
The song has received positive reviews from critics. Billboard described the song as "a bizarrely catchy track". Greg Kot of the Chicago Tribune positively compared the song to songs from the band's debut album Treats, stating that "the production is more refined" and has "a more spacious arrangement".

References

2012 songs
2012 singles
Mom + Pop Music singles
Sleigh Bells (band) songs
Songs written by Alexis Krauss